A benign melanocytic nevus (also known as "Banal nevus," "Common acquired melanocytic nevus," "Mole," "Nevocellular nevus," and "Nevocytic nevus") is a cutaneous condition characterised by well-circumscribed, pigmented, round or ovoid lesions, generally measuring from 2 to 6 mm in diameter. A benign melanocytic nevus may feature hair or pigmentation as well.

Types

The three most common categories of benign melanocytic nevi are those located at the border between the epidermis and dermis (junctional nevi), intradermal nevi in the dermis only, and those found in both the dermis and epidermis (compound nevi).

Epidemiology
This skin lesion is quite common in the population, and it can present at birth, known as a congenital meloncytic nevus, or later in life as an acquired nevus. Should the nevi appear in toddler- or school-aged children, they are more likely to remain present throughout the rest of that person's life. If they arise in adolescence and adulthood, the nevi most likely occur due to sun damage. With appropriate coverage from the sun, these lesions may go away over time. Also, lighter-skinned people tend to have nevi more frequently than dark-skinned people.

Link to melanoma
There is a distinction between a benign melanocytic nevus and melanoma, a type of skin cancer. Both of these conditions originate from the same type of cell: the melanocyte. However, a melanocytic nevus is benign, and melanoma is malignant. Nearly two-thirds of melanocytic nevi never evolve into a cancer, but over 30% do. Moreover, dermatologists have a standardized system for determining whether a skin lesion is suspicious for malignant melanoma. It is as follows:

The above table features each warning sign for suspected melanoma. If a person notes that they have a skin lesion with some of these characteristics, a dermatologist would be able to help them with further evaluation. If melanoma is detected and treated early before it spreads in a process called metastasis, it carries a good prognosis.

See also 
 Becker's nevus
 List of cutaneous conditions

References 

Melanocytic nevi and neoplasms